Lottstetten is a railway station in the German state of Baden-Württemberg and municipality of Lottstetten.

Special situation
Despite its location in Germany, the station is located on the Eglisau to Neuhausen line of the Swiss Federal Railway (SBB) that crosses the Germany–Switzerland border twice on its route between the Swiss cantons of Zurich and Schaffhausen. Lottstetten is one of only two Swiss operated stations located entirely within Germany, the other being Jestetten. Until December 2010 a third station was in operation, namely Altenburg-Rheinau, located in Altenburg, part of Jestetten, close to the border with Neuhausen am Rheinfall, Switzerland, however despite protests from the German authorities, the station was closed by the Swiss due to low passenger numbers.

None of the lines running to or through Lottstetten have a direct rail connection to the German railway network.

The station is a border station and as such is in local transport tariff zones in both Germany and Switzerland.

Trains which pass through Lottstetten without stopping at any of the stations on the line in Germany, are not subject to any customs formalities or restrictions of either country, despite the train and its passengers technically leaving the Swiss customs area, entering the European Union customs area and entering the Swiss customs area again. An agreement in this respect was entered into by the two countries and became law in 1936. From 1840 until 1935, Lottstetten, along with Altenburg, Jestetten and what was then Dettighofen, was part of the region which formed a customs exclusion zone and was not part of the German customs area.

Operation
The station is operated by the SBB and is served by Zurich S-Bahn line S9 that provides an hourly service between Zürich and Schaffhausen.

Customs
Lottstetten is a border station for passengers arriving from Switzerland. Customs checks may be performed in Lottstetten station by German officials. Systematic passport controls were abolished when Switzerland joined the Schengen Area in 2008.

References

External links
Lottstetten station on Swiss Federal Railway's web site

Lottstetten
Lottstetten